NE-100 or 4-methoxy-3-(2-phenylethoxy)-N,N-dipropylbenzeneethanamine is a selective sigma-1 receptor antagonist, with a reported binding affinity of Ki = 1.03 ± 0.01 nM, and more than 205 times selectivity over the sigma-2 receptor.

NE-100 was one of the earliest selective sigma-1 receptor ligands reported and has been widely used as a pharmacological tool. The original, eight step synthesis of NE-100 was reported by Atsuro Nakazato and colleagues of Taisho Pharmaceutical Company in 1999. More recently, Michael Kassiou and co-workers have reported a more expedient synthesis of NE-100 that proceeds in 56% unoptimized yield over 4 steps.

References

Phenol ethers